The Raft River Mountains are a mountain range in northern Box Elder County, Utah, United States. The mountains are located in the Raft River Division of the Minidoka Ranger District of the Sawtooth National Forest. Tributaries of the Raft River drain the northern slopes of the range to the Snake River then Columbia River and Pacific Ocean, while the southern slopes drain to the Great Salt Lake.

Geography
Located in the Sawtooth National Forest, the range's montane forest ecoregion is "surrounded by montane steppes and desert".  The range is oriented in an east–west orientation, and is a portion of the Great Basin Divide and the Basin and Range Province between the Bonneville Basin of the Great Basin (south).

Geology
The central mass of the range consists of Precambrian metamorphic rocks. The Elba Quartzite with interlayered schist outcrops along the southern slopes of the range and in the Grouse Creek Mountains to the southwest. Cambrian quartzite outcrops in the west part of the range and in the Grouse Creek range and the Goose Creek Mountains to the west. The thinly bedded quartzites have been quarried for building stone in the area.

Flora and fauna
The range's plants and animals include pines and rodents of the Northern Basin & Range ecoregion of the Columbia Plateau.

Camping and activities
The range's Bull Flat trail leads to Bull Flat, Bull Lake, and Bull Mountain, and passes former mines (the trailhead is near a campground).

Peaks

References

References

Mountain ranges of Box Elder County, Utah
Mountain ranges of Utah
Sawtooth National Forest